Diego Aguirregomezcorta (born 9 December 1974) is an Argentine former rower. He competed in the men's coxless pair event at the 2000 Summer Olympics.

References

External links
 

1974 births
Living people
Argentine male rowers
Olympic rowers of Argentina
Rowers at the 2000 Summer Olympics
Rowers from Buenos Aires
Rowers at the 1999 Pan American Games
Pan American Games medalists in rowing
Pan American Games silver medalists for Argentina
Medalists at the 1999 Pan American Games